Qualification for the Boxing Events at the 2012 Summer Olympics is based on the WBS Individual Championships, the 2011 World Championships and 5 Continental Qualifying Events to be held in 2012. Qualification for the women's events was at the World Championships only.

Qualification summary

Qualification timeline

Men's events

Olympic Qualification System per Continent and by Weight Category.

 Tripartite Selection Quota

Light flyweight (49 kg)

Flyweight (52 kg)

* Both England and Wales boxers qualified but Andrew Selby beat Khalid Yafai in box-off for Olympic place.

Bantamweight (56 kg)

Lightweight (60 kg)

* Wang Zhimin from China, who won the 2011 WSB Individual Championships at this weight, had his qualification withdrawn by the Chinese NOC. Yerzhan Mussafirov from Kazakhstan, as losing finalist in that competition would have inherited the Olympic berth but was also withdrawn by his NOC. Rachid Azzedine from France inherited the qualification place by virtue of his third-place finish.

Light welterweight (64 kg)

Welterweight (69 kg)

Middleweight (75 kg)

* Sergiy Derevyanchenko from Ukraine, who won the 2011 WSB Individual Championships at this weight, had his qualification withdrawn by the Ukrainian NOC. Soltan Migitinov from Azerbaijan inherited the qualification place by virtue of his second-place finish.

Light heavyweight (81 kg)

Heavyweight (91 kg)

Super heavyweight (+91 kg)

Women's events
Olympic Qualification System per Continent and by Weight Category.

 Tripartite Selection Quota

Flyweight (51 kg)

Lightweight (60 kg)

Middleweight (75 kg)

References
General
 London 2012 Olympic Games – Qualified Boxers’ List

Specific

Qualification for the 2012 Summer Olympics